Brennan Carroll (born March 20, 1979) is the offensive coordinator for the Arizona Wildcats.  His nickname is BC. His father is NFL coach Pete Carroll.

High school career
Carroll played high school football at Saratoga High School in Saratoga, California.

College career
Carroll played college football as a tight end at the University of Pittsburgh (1999–2001) after transferring from the University of Delaware (1997).

Coaching career
In 2002, Carroll joined the USC Trojans football team staff as a graduate assistant under his father, Pete Carroll, who was then head coach.  During his first season he worked with offense and special teams.  During his second season on staff, he worked with the tight ends.  In 2004, he became the full-time assistant coach in charge of tight ends.  In 2007, in addition to his work as an assistant coach, he became the team's Recruiting Coordinator.  Also in 2007, Trojans tight end Fred Davis, who Brennan coached, won the John Mackey Award, which goes to the nation's top tight end.  In February 2010, it was announced that the recently hired head coach Lane Kiffin would not retain Brennan Carroll.

Brennan Caroll did not coach during the 2010 college or NFL seasons. 

On December 22, 2010, it was announced that Carroll would join Al Golden's staff at the University of Miami where he assumed the role of TE coach and recruiting coordinator.

On January 10, 2013, Carroll moved to WR coach, while retaining the recruiting coordinator title, after the Hurricanes hired Mario Cristobal as their Associate HC and TE Coach.

On February 9, 2015, Carroll joined an NFL staff for the first time in his career after spending 13 years in the college ranks, reuniting with his father Pete. Carroll assumed the role of assistant offensive line coach. 

Prior to the 2020 NFL season, Carroll received a promotion and was named run game coordinator. 

On January 1, 2021, Carroll joined the Arizona Wildcats team staff as offensive coordinator and O-line coach, reunited with head coach Jedd Fisch who worked with Carroll at Miami during a stint where Carroll was the recruiting coordinator and coached tight ends.

Personal life
Carroll's father is Pete Carroll and his brother Nate is currently the wide receivers coach for the Seattle Seahawks.

Brennan Carroll and his wife Amber have one son, Dillon Brennan Carroll.

References

External links
Brennan Carroll – USC Athletic Department bio
Brennan Carroll – HurricaneSports Bio

1979 births
Living people
People from Saratoga, California
American football tight ends
Delaware Fightin' Blue Hens football players
Pittsburgh Panthers football players
USC Trojans football coaches
Miami Hurricanes football coaches
Players of American football from California
Seattle Seahawks coaches
Sportspeople from Santa Clara County, California